World Sport is a weekday news-magazine television series on CNN International that delivers a roundup of global sports news. The program is broadcast from the network's world headquarters at CNN Center in Atlanta, Georgia, and from the bureau in London.

The series launched in October 1993 and is the oldest continually broadcast program across the network. It is primarily anchored by Don Riddell. The other hosts include Amanda Davies, Patrick Snell, Kate Riley, Alex Thomas, Christina Macfarlane and Rhiannon Jones. World Sport was relaunched with an updated graphics package and lower third alongside CNN's other programmes in February 2015.

References

External links 

 Official Site
 

1993 American television series debuts
1990s American television news shows
2000s American television news shows
2010s American television news shows
2020s American television news shows